Lamarosa is a former civil parish in the municipality of Coimbra, Portugal. The population in 2011 was 2,069, in an area of 16.16 km2. On 28 January 2013 it merged with São Martinho de Árvore to form São Martinho de Árvore e Lamarosa.

It was previously called Santo Varão da Lamarosa which was part of the then-municipality Tentúgal. It was disbanded on 31 December 1853 and became part of the municipality of Coimbra.

References 

Former parishes of Coimbra